The 2020 Boise State Broncos football team represented Boise State University during the 2020 NCAA Division I FBS football season. The Broncos played their home games at Albertsons Stadium in Boise, Idaho, as members of the Mountain West Conference. They were led by seventh-year head coach Bryan Harsin.

After the season was suspended due to the COVID-19 pandemic, then reinstated, the Broncos played seven games, compiling a 5–2 record (5–0 in conference play). The team then lost to San Jose State in the Mountain West Championship Game. On December 20, the team announced that it had decided to forgo playing in any bowl game. The program had appeared in 18 consecutive bowl games, dating back to the 2002 Humanitarian Bowl.

On December 22, head coach Bryan Harsin resigned to become the head coach at Auburn. He finished at Boise State with a seven-year record of 69–19.

Previous season

The Broncos finished the 2019 season 12–2, 8–0 in Mountain West, becoming champions of the Mountain Division. They represented the Mountain Division in the Mountain West Championship Game where they defeated Hawaii.  They were invited to the Las Vegas Bowl where they lost to Washington.

Schedule
Boise State announced its 2020 football schedule on February 27, 2020. The 2020 schedule consisted of 7 home and 5 away games in the regular season. On August 10, 2020, the Mountain West Conference announced the suspension of the football season due to the COVID-19 pandemic. The new schedule was released by the Mountain West on October 1, 2020.

Game summaries

Utah State

    
    
    
    
    
    
    

 Passing leaders: Hank Bachmeier (BSU): 20–28, 268 YDS, 3 TD; Jason Shelley (USU): 14–27, 92 YDS, 1 INT.
 Rushing leaders: George Holani (BSU): 14 CAR, 100 YDS, 1 TD; Jaylen Warren (USU): 23 CAR, 89 YDS, 2 TD.
 Receiving leaders: Khalil Shakir (BSU): 7 REC, 123 YDS, 2 TD; Deven Thompkins (USU): 5 REC, 37 YDS.

at Air Force

    
    
    
    
    
    
    
    
    
    
    

 Passing leaders: Jack Sears (BSU): 17–20, 280 YDS, 3 TD; Warren Bryan (AF): 3–6, 38 YDS.
 Rushing leaders: Andrew Van Buren (BSU): 12 CAR, 70 YDS, 2 TD; Brandon Lewis (AF): 10 CAR, 112 YDS, 1 TD.
 Receiving leaders: CT Thomas (BSU): 2 REC, 101 YDS, 2 TD; Kyle Patterson (AF): 3 REC, 38 YDS.

BYU

    
    
    
    
    
    
    
    
    
    

 Passing leaders: Cade Fennegan (BSU): 15–26, 182 YDS, 2 TD, 1 INT; Zach Wilson (BYU): 21–27, 359 YDS, 2 TD.
 Rushing leaders: Andrew Van Buren	 (BSU): 16 CAR, 45 YDS; Tyler Allgeier (BYU): 14 CAR, 123 YDS, 2 TD.
 Receiving leaders: Khalil Shakir (BSU): 10 REC, 139 YDS, 2 TD; Gunner Romney (BYU): 6 REC, 133 YDS.

Colorado State

    
    
    
    
    
    
    
    
    
    

 Passing leaders: Hank Bachmeier (BSU): 16–28, 202 YDS, 1 TD; Patrick O'Brien (CSU): 9–20, 140 YDS, 1 INT.
 Rushing leaders: Andrew Van Buren (BSU): 13 CAR, 28 YDS, 2 TD; A'Jon Vivens (CSU): 12 CAR, 76 YDS, 1 TD.
 Receiving leaders: CT Thomas (BSU): 6 REC, 103 YDS; Dante Wright (CSU): 5 REC, 109 YDS.

at Hawaii

    
    
    
    
    
    
    
    
    
    
    

 Passing leaders: Hank Bachmeier (BSU): 21–31, 278 YDS, 1 TD, 1 INT; Chevan Cordeiro (HAW): 25–48, 253 YDS, 3 TD.
 Rushing leaders: Andrew Van Buren (BSU): 27 CAR, 113 YDS, 2 TD; Chevan Cordeiro (HAW): 18 CAR, 90 YDS.
 Receiving leaders: Khalil Shakir (BSU): 11 REC, 130 YDS, 2 TD; Miles Reed (HAW): 6 REC, 69 YDS.

at Wyoming

    
    
    
    
    
    

 Passing leaders: Hank Bachmeier (BSU): 19–28, 181 YDS, 1 TD, 1 INT; Levi Williams (WYO): 3–13, 45 YDS.
 Rushing leaders: Andrew Van Buren (BSU): 25 CAR, 79 YDS, 1 TD; Xazavian Valladay (WYO): 11 CAR, 59 YDS.
 Receiving leaders: Khalil Shakir (BSU): 8 REC, 105 YDS; Xazavian Valladay (WYO): 1 REC, 29 YDS.

vs San Jose State (Mountain West Championship Game)

 Passing leaders: Hank Bachmeier (BSU): 20-40, 221 YDS; Nick Starkel (SJSU): 32-52, 453 YDS, 3 TD.
 Rushing leaders: Andrew Van Buren (BSU): 11 CAR, 26 YDS; Kairee Robinson (SJSU): 12 CAR, 39 YDS.
 Receiving leaders: Khalil Shakir (BSU): 6 REC, 85 YDS; Tre Walker (SJSU): 7 REC, 137 YDS, 1 TD.

Personnel

Staff

Roster

Rankings

Chaplain controversy 
Following a game against the Brigham Young University Cougars on November 6, 2020, most of the players of both teams knelt midfield at Boise's Albertsons Stadium. Images of the unusual prayer circulated on social media and the story was covered by Deseret News who reported that the prayer was led by Boise State's team chaplain Pastor Mark Thornton. "We started with prayer, we're going to end with prayer, and we're going to give the glory to God," said Thornton. The chaplain had regularly lead prayer on the field after games and held chapel the night before.

The story of Boise State, a public university, having an official team chaplain organizing religious services drew the attention of the Freedom From Religion Foundation (FFRF). The foundation sent a letter to Boise State President Marlene Tromp stating that employing a chaplain was a constitutional violation and that it could make some student athletes feel coerced into prayers against their wishes. FFRF Staff Attorney Christopher Line explained, "Government chaplains may only exist as an accommodation of a public employee’s religious beliefs when the government makes it difficult or impossible to seek out private ministries...Boise State football players have no government-imposed burden on their religion, so there is no need — or legitimate legal reason — for Boise State to provide a chaplain for them."

Boise State responded by eliminating the official chaplain position and pledged to take measures to "resolve the issue and establish appropriate constitutional boundaries." President Tromp emphasized the importance of students' rights to make their own choices about their spiritual lives, telling Deseret News, "Boise State will always support our students’ right to pray, should they wish to do so. As a public institution, we cannot sponsor or endorse a specific religious advisor."

The Becket Fund for Religious Liberty, a non-profit law firm promoting religious accommodationism, criticized the FFRF after Boise State's pledge to reform. Becket Fund vice president Luke Goodrich called the FFRF "bullies" and erroneously claimed that it had forced a Kansas middle school to end their Christmas toy drive. "Many public universities have team chaplains, and it’s not only constitutional but good to accommodate players’ voluntary religious practices in this way," said Goodrich.

Players drafted into the NFL

References

Boise State
Boise State Broncos football seasons
Boise State Broncos football